The parliamentary borough of Finsbury was a constituency of the House of Commons of the UK Parliament from 1832 to 1885, and from 1918 to 1950. The constituency was first created in 1832 as one of seven two-seat "metropolis" parliamentary boroughs (five in southeast Middlesex and two in northeast Surrey) other than the two which already existed: Westminster and the City of London; the latter until 1885 retained an exceptional four seats. Finsbury was directly north of the City of London and was smaller than the Finsbury division of the Ossulstone hundred but took in land of Holborn division (hundred division) to its southwest in pre-introduction changes by Boundary Commissioners.  It included Finsbury, Holborn, Moorfields, Clerkenwell, Islington, Stoke Newington and historic St Pancras (later mainly known as Camden Town). The 1918 constituency corresponded to the smaller Metropolitan Borough of Finsbury (Finsbury, Moorfields, Clerkenwell, and St Luke's, Islington); it was a seat, thus electing a single member, fulfilling a longstanding aim of Chartism which underscored the 1832 reforms.

History

1832–1885 two-member constituency / parliamentary borough 
The original constituency was created by the Parliamentary Boundaries Act 1832, which carried into effect the redistribution of parliamentary seats under the Reform Act 1832.

It was originally proposed that the constituency would comprise the entire Finsbury Division and a number of adjoining parishes in the Holborn Division of Ossulstone, one of the hundreds of Middlesex. The commissioners appointed under the Boundaries Act decided to exclude the northern part of the Finsbury Division, which extended as far as Friern Barnet, some nine miles from London and a largely rural area. They could find no natural boundary to separate "the Rural from the Town District" and suggested that the dividing line should run through the northern section of Islington, following limits of relatively recently founded Church of England parishes. The seat as eventually created included the whole of Islington, however.

The parliamentary borough was defined in Schedule O of the Boundaries Act as:
The several Parishes of Saint Luke, Saint George the Martyr, St Giles in the Fields, Saint George Bloomsbury, Saint Mary Stoke Newington, and St. Mary, Islington; the several Liberties or Places of Saffron Hill, Hatton Garden, Ely Rents, Ely Place, the Rolls, Glass House Yard, and the Charterhouse; Lincoln's Inn and Gray's Inn; the Parish of St. James and St. John Clerkenwell, except that Part thereof which is situate to the North of the Parish of Islington; those Parts of the respective Parishes of Saint Sepulchre and Saint Andrew Holborn and of Furnivals Inn and Staple Inn respectively, which are situated without the Liberty of the City of London.

The Redistribution of Seats Act 1885 divided the constituency, by then highly populated, into seven new single member constituencies. Four were divisions of a new Parliamentary Borough of Islington; while the Finsbury Parliamentary Borough was divided into three, named Central Division, East Division and Holborn Division.

1918–1950 seat 

The Representation of the People Act 1918 created a new single-member Finsbury Parliamentary borough in the County of London, identical to the Metropolitan Borough of Finsbury. In 1950, it was merged with the neighbouring borough of Shoreditch to become Shoreditch and Finsbury.

Members of Parliament

MPs 1832–1885 
The parliamentary borough returned two members of parliament

MPs 1918–1950 
The borough was a single-member constituency.

Elections

Elections in the 1910s

Elections in the 1920s

Elections in the 1930s 

General Election 1939–40

Another General Election was required to take place before the end of 1940. The political parties had been making preparations for an election to take place and by the Autumn of 1939, the following candidates had been selected; 
Labour: George Woods
National Labour: Frederick Burden

Elections in the 1940s

Elections in the 1880s

Elections in the 1870s

Elections in the 1860s

 
 

 
 

 Caused by Duncombe's death.

Elections in the 1850s

Elections in the 1840s

Elections in the 1830s

 

 
 

 

 Caused by Grant's appointment as Governor of Bombay

References

 Parliamentary Boundaries Act 1832 (2 & 3 Will. 4 c.64)
 Representation of the People Act 1918 (7 & 8 Geo. 5 c.64)
Youngs, F. A., Guide to the Local Administrative Units of England, Vol.1, Southern England, London, 1979

Parliamentary constituencies in London (historic)
Constituencies of the Parliament of the United Kingdom established in 1832
Constituencies of the Parliament of the United Kingdom disestablished in 1885
Constituencies of the Parliament of the United Kingdom established in 1918
Constituencies of the Parliament of the United Kingdom disestablished in 1950
Political history of Middlesex